Erigeron strigosus is a species of flowering plant in the family Asteraceae known by the common names prairie fleabane, common eastern fleabane, and daisy fleabane.

Erigeron strigosus is native to eastern and central North America as far west as Manitoba, Idaho and Texas. It has also become naturalized in western North America as well as in Europe and China as a somewhat weedy naturalized species.

Erigeron strigosus is an annual or biennial herb reaching heights of up to 80 cm (32 inches). It has hairy, petioled, non-clasping, oval-shaped leaves a few centimeters long mostly on the lower part of the plant. One plant can produce as many as 200 flower heads in a spindly array of branching stems. Each head is less than a centimeter (0.4 inches) wide, containing 50–100 white, pink, or blue ray florets surrounding numerous yellow disc florets.

Varieties
Erigeron strigosus var. calcicola J. R. Allison - Alabama, Georgia, Tennessee
Erigeron strigosus var. dolomiticola J. R. Allison - Alabama
Erigeron strigosus var. strigosus - much of North America; introduced in China
Erigeron strigosus var. septentrionalis (Fernald & Wiegand) Fernald - much of North America; introduced in Europe

References

External links

UC Calphotos gallery of Erigeron strigosus
Jepson Manual Treatment: Erigeron strigosus

strigosus
Flora of Eastern Canada
Flora of the Eastern United States
Plants described in 1803
Taxa named by Gotthilf Heinrich Ernst Muhlenberg